Al Kout Mall is a shopping mall in Fahaheel (Ahmadi governorate), Kuwait that opened in 10 February 2005. It contains fountains which offer a night show. It is one of the biggest malls in Kuwait. The mall hosts many regional and international brands and a traditional market.

References 

Shopping malls in Kuwait
2005 establishments in Kuwait
Shopping malls established in 2005
Tourist attractions in Kuwait